Kévin Thobois (born 20 February 1992 in Izier) is a French Grand Prix motorcycle racer.

Career statistics

By season

Races by year
(key)

References

External links
 Profile on motogp.com

French motorcycle racers
Living people
125cc World Championship riders
1992 births